Devil's Peak (Afrikaans: Duiwelspiek) is part of the mountainous backdrop to Cape Town, South Africa. When looking at Table Mountain from the city centre, or when looking at the standard picture postcard view of the mountain, the skyline is from left to right: the spire of Devil's Peak, the flat mesa of Table Mountain, the dome of Lion's Head and Signal Hill.

The central districts of Cape Town are nestled within this natural amphitheatre. The city grew out of a settlement founded on the shore below the mountains in 1652 by Jan van Riebeeck, for the Dutch East India Company. Some of the first farms in the Cape were established on the slopes of Devil's Peak, along the Liesbeek River.

One can walk to the top (western slopes provide the easiest approach) but the ascent is more pleasant and safer outside of the cold, wet, winter months of May to August.

Landmarks 

The Rhodes Memorial to Cecil Rhodes, and the University of Cape Town are situated on the eastern slopes of Devil's Peak. From these vantages one can gaze down upon the southern suburbs of Cape Town and over the sandy Cape Flats towards Stellenbosch, Somerset West, and the distant Boland mountains. Other landmarks on the eastern slopes are Mostert's Mill, Groote Schuur Hospital, and the Groote Schuur estate, including a number of presidential and ministerial residences.

A number of historic military blockhouses are situated on Devil's Peak, along with a number of cannons intended to defend the city from attack from the south. There is an abandoned fire lookout high up on Mowbray Ridge.

On 26 May 1971 a formation of three military aircraft, flying by sight along the N2 highway, banked to the right three seconds too late, narrowly missing the University and Rhodes Memorial but subsequently crashing into the side of the mountain. For many years a radar reflector beacon stood on Plumpudding Hill above Rhodes Memorial to prevent similar incidents.

Hiking
There are a lot of easy walks on the lower slopes of the mountain. A popular short hike is from Rhodes Memorial to the King's blockhouse.  The only safe ascent of the peak is from the Saddle, between the peak and Table Mountain. There are three routes to reach the Saddle: from Tafelberg Road on the city side, up Newlands Ravine from Newlands Forest, or the upper contour path from Mowbray Ridge and Minor Peak. Once on the Saddle, a straightforward path climbs directly to the summit.  The 360° view from the summit is well worth the slog.

The peak is very exposed to wind and mist, so hikers must always take care.  A number of the descents on the Southern Suburbs side are very steep and wet, and are highly dangerous (particularly Second Waterfall Ravine, Dark Gorge and Els Ravine). These routes should not be attempted, as many lives have been lost by hikers taking the wrong route. The general rule that applies is to stick to known and well-marked paths, and not to push on into the unknown.

Vegetation

The northern slopes overlooking the city centre are covered in typical Cape Peninsula Shale Fynbos. These slopes are hotter and prone to frequent fires, and as a result the vegetation is low. Here can also be found a small stretch of critically endangered Peninsula Shale Renosterveld vegetation, an endemic vegetation type that used to dominate the Cape Town City Bowl but is now mostly lost due to urban development.

The slopes on the Southern Suburbs side however, are naturally wetter and more protected from fires, so these slopes were originally partially covered with deep indigenous forests. Some of these dense afro-montane forests still remain in the gorges, but most of them were cut down to make way for commercial pine plantations. Near Rhodes Memorial there are a few surviving natural stands of a famous native tree called the Silvertree. This is possibly the last place on earth where the tree still grows wild.

During the second half of the 19th century and the first half of the 20th, Devil's Peak (and other adjacent heights) were commercially planted with plantations of cluster pines, a problematic invasive non-indigenous tree. Local authorities organized paid workers and volunteers to chop down the pines from the peak and most of them are now gone (although in Newlands Forest on the lower reaches, pine and gum forests are still maintained for recreational purposes). The original indigenous Afro-montane forest is also slowly re-growing on the southern slopes and above Newlands forest where the pines have been cleared. Stone pines (a non-invasive alien tree) still remain in the area around Rhodes Memorial.

Fauna 

Near Rhodes Memorial, some of the lower slopes of Devil's Peak are artificially maintained as savanna, and some herds of eland, wildebeest and zebra are kept there.

In the 1930s, a few Himalayan tahrs (wild goats) escaped from a zoo on the slopes of Devil's Peak and bred until their population on the Table Mountain range was over 700. A culling programme has eliminated most of them, although a few still remain. Some of the original local species of small antelope are being re-introduced to replace the tahrs. Around Rhodes Memorial there were also some feral deer of European origin, which can still be found on the lower slopes.

Indigenous animals include porcupines, caracals, small grey mongoose, rock hyraxes (also known as dassies), and many species of bird.

Geology 

The upper, rocky parts of Devil's Peak, Table Mountain and Lion's Head consist of a hard, uniform and resistant sandstone commonly known as the Table Mountain sandstone or TMS. (This is, however, no longer used as a formal geological name). The tough sandstone rests conformably upon a basal shale that in turn lies unconformably upon a basement of older (Late Precambrian) rocks (Malmesbury shale/slate and the Cape Granite). The basal shale and the older rocks below it weather much faster than the TMS and for this reason the lower slopes are smoother in all parts, with few outcrops and deeper soil. Millions of years of erosion have stripped all of the TMS from Signal Hill and that is why it looks very rounded compared to its sister peaks. There is a road that runs almost on the contour from the lower cable station on Table Mountain along the mountain to Devil's Peak. As it turns east around the bulk of Devil's Peak the road cuttings expose a few famous geological unconformities, which illustrate very clearly that the Malmesbury rocks were folded, baked, intruded by granite and planed down by millions of years of erosion before the area sank below the ocean and a new sequence of sediments, including the TMS, began to accumulate.

Origins of the name 
Devil's Peak was originally known as Windberg or Charles Mountain. The English term Devil's Peak is a 19th-century translation from the Dutch Duivels Kop, and supposedly comes from the folk-tale about a Dutch man called Jan van Hunks, a prodigious pipe smoker who lived at the foot of the mountain circa 1700. He was forced by his wife to leave the house whenever he smoked his pipe. One day, while smoking on the slopes of the peak, he met a mysterious stranger who also smoked.  They each bragged of how much they smoked and so they fell into a pipe-smoking contest. The stranger turned out to be the devil and Van Hunks eventually won the contest, but not before the smoke that they had made had covered the mountain, forming the table cloth cloud. The story was captured by the 19th century poet Dante Gabriel Rossetti in his poem Jan van Hunks (alternatively called The Dutchman's Wager).
However, since Rosetti's poem was only published in 1909, it's unlikely that this was the true source of the name, rather an urban legend.

It has also been claimed that the name is a corruption of Duifespiek ("Dove's Peak") to Duivelspiek ("Devil's Peak"), since the Dutch words for devil and dove are relatively close in sound. The Dutch word "Duivelspiek" has been the common Afrikaans language name for the mountain and the suburb on the east side of the city bowl. The name is also thought to have been derived from the mountain's 'three pronged' spear shape, which is reminiscent of the spear held by the Devil in many images.

A more likely explanation is provided by Devil's Peak Brewery. Forty years before Vasco de Gama rounded the Cape in 1497, the Venetian cartographer Fra Mauro created a map of the world for King Alfonso V of Portugal, based on knowledge drawn from the Arabians. On this map, which became the definitive view of the world for the early Portuguese explorers, he named the southernmost tip of Africa, Cabo di Diab – the Devil's Cape. It is very likely the association with the devil simply migrated from the Cape to the mountain that flanks it. After all, sailors are a superstitious lot and Devil's Peak remains the path through which the Cape Southeaster howls, churning up the waves in the Cape of Storms.

1971 Plane Crash

On 26 May 1971, three South African Air Force Hawker-Siddeley HS125 (Code named Mercurius) aircraft crashed into Devil's Peak, killing all 11 on board. The aircraft were flying in close formation, practicing for a fly-past during the upcoming 10th-anniversary Republic Day celebrations on 31 May. A low cloud base was cited as a contributory factor. The impact was heard throughout the surrounding suburbs, and scars in the ground can still be seen today.

See also

References

Table Mountain
Aviation accidents and incidents in South Africa
Table Mountain National Park